Tree of Knowledge may refer to:

Religion and mythology
 Tree of the knowledge of good and evil, a tree in the Garden of Eden, mentioned in the Book of Genesis
 Yggdrasil, the Norse world tree, from which Odin hung upside down in exchange for knowledge

Publications
 The Tree of Knowledge (novel), a 1911 novel by Pío Baroja
 Drvo znanja, a Croatian magazine
 Tree of Knowledge, a 1970s publication by Marshall Cavendish
 The Tree of Knowledge: The Biological Roots of Human Understanding, a 1987 book by Humberto Maturana and Francisco Varela (1987)

Films 
The Tree of Knowledge (1920 film), a 1920 silent film directed by William C. deMille
 Tree of Knowledge (film) (Kundskabens træ), a 1981 acclaimed Danish coming-of-age drama directed by Nils Malmros

Places
 Tree of Knowledge (Australia), the traditional birthplace of the Australian Labor Party
 Tree of Knowledge, Camooweal, a tree associated with knowledge exchange in Camooweal, Queensland, Australia
 Kidman's Tree of Knowledge, a tree on Glengyle Station, Bedourie, Queensland, Australia associated with pastoralist Sidney Kidman

Other meanings 
 Tree of knowledge (philosophy), a metaphor used by Descartes
 Tree of knowledge system, a conceptual approach to the unification of psychology theories
 The Tree of Knowledge (mural), a work of public art in Salford, England, by Alan Boyson

See also
Tree of Science (disambiguation)